Glendale Township is a township in Saline County, Kansas, in the United States.  The unincorporated community of Glendale is located within its boundaries.

History
Glendale Township was organized in 1880.

References

Further reading

External links
 Saline County maps: Current, Historic, KDOT

Townships in Saline County, Kansas
Townships in Kansas
1880 establishments in Kansas
Populated places established in 1880